Salkım, historically and still known as Hıyam, is a village in the Nizip District, Gaziantep Province, Turkey. The village had a population of 878 in 2021. It is populated by Turkmens of the Barak tribe.

References

Villages in Nizip District